In Inuit mythology, Eeyeekalduk was the god of medicine and good health.

Health gods
Inuit gods